The Colorado Department of Education (CDE) is the principal department of the Colorado state government that is responsible for education. It is headquartered in Denver. Members of the Colorado State Board of Education are charged by the Colorado Constitution with the general supervision of the public schools. They have numerous powers and duties specified in state law. Individuals are elected on a partisan basis to serve six-year terms without pay.

See also

Colorado State Board of Education
Colorado Department of Higher Education
Teacher Institute at La Academia

References

External links
 Colorado Department of Education

Public education in Colorado
State departments of education of the United States
State agencies of Colorado